Frederick "Fred" Ingley (November 20, 1878 – February 15, 1951) was the fourth bishop of Colorado in the Episcopal Church from 1938 to 1949; previously coadjutor since 1921.

Early life and education
Ingley was born on November 20, 1878, in Staffordshire, England, the son of Albert Ingley and Mary Bloomer. After emigrating to the United States with his parents, he was educated at the Pittsburgh public schools. He then studied at the Philadelphia Divinity School, graduating with a Bachelor of Divinity in 1906. In 1920 he was awarded a Doctor of Sacred Theology from the Philadelphia Divinity School, and in 1928 a Doctor of Divinity from Colorado College.

Ordained ministry
Ingley was ordained deacon on June 17, 1906, and priest on February 17, 1907, by the Bishop of Pittsburgh Cortlandt Whitehead. Between 1906 and 1908, he served as deacon, and then priest-in-charge of St Mary's Church in Braddock, Pennsylvania, and between 1908 and 1917 as rector of St Matthew's Church in Kenosha, Wisconsin. In 1917, he became rector of St Mark's Church in Denver, Colorado, where he remained till 1921.

Bishop
In 1921, Ingley was elected Coadjutor Bishop of Colorado, and was consecrated on June 11, 1921, at St John's Cathedral in Denver, Colorado, by Presiding Bishop Daniel S. Tuttle. He succeeded as diocesan in 1938, and retired in 1949. He died on February 15, 1951, in Denver Colorado.

Family
Ingley married Eidth Mary Hansen in 1909. They had 5 children, Mary, Elizabeth, Ruth, Jane, and Hansen.

References 

1878 births
1951 deaths
People from Staffordshire
Episcopal Divinity School alumni
Colorado College alumni
Episcopal bishops of Colorado